The Tesoura River is a river of Goiás state in central Brazil. The Tesoura River and all rivers of Goiás drain to the Atlantic Ocean.

See also
List of rivers of Goiás

References
Brazilian Ministry of Transport

Rivers of Goiás